Edward Robert Emerson (1838–1926) was Archdeacon of Cork from 1890 until 1926.

Emerson was educated at Bandon Grammar School and Trinity College, Dublin and ordained in 1861. After a curacy at Fanlobbus, he was rector of St Edmunds, Cork from 1865 to 1890 and treasurer of Saint Fin Barre's Cathedral from 1899.

He died on 30 November 1926.

References

1838 births
People educated at Bandon Grammar School
Alumni of Trinity College Dublin
1926 deaths
Archdeacons of Cork